Richland Township is one of eight townships in Fulton County, Indiana. As of the 2010 census, its population was 1,181 and it contained 502 housing units.

History
The Bert Leedy Round Barn was listed on the National Register of Historic Places in 1993.

Geography

Unincorporated towns
 Richland Center
 Tiosa

Adjacent townships
 Green Township, Marshall County (north)
 Walnut Township, Marshall County (northeast)
 Newcastle Township (east)
 Rochester Township (south)
 Aubbeenaubbee Township (west)
 Union Township, Marshall County (northwest)

Major highways
 U.S. Route 31
 State Road 110

Cemeteries
The township contains one cemetery, Sand Hill.

References
 United States Census Bureau cartographic boundary files
 U.S. Board on Geographic Names

External links
 Indiana Township Association
 United Township Association of Indiana

Townships in Fulton County, Indiana
Townships in Indiana